OpenStudio is a suite of free and open-source software applications for building energy analysis used in building information modeling. OpenStudio applications run on Microsoft Windows, Macintosh, and Linux platforms. Its primary application is a plugin for proprietary SketchUp, that enables engineers to view and edit 3D models for EnergyPlus simulation software.

OpenStudio was first released in April 2008 by the National Renewable Energy Laboratory, a part of the U.S. Department of Energy. NREL reports an average of 700 OpenStudio downloads per month. Google's strategist for SketchUp, remarked that "OpenStudio is lauded around our office as one of the most complicated plug-ins ever written for SketchUp".

OpenStudio was designed to work with SketchUp, because many architects already use SketchUp for building designs. The integration allows architects to analyze a design's energy performance before beginning construction.

The first private organization selected by NREL to conduct OpenStudio courses was Performance Systems Development, a New York-based training institute. Courses will be conducted for building professionals, software developers, and utility administrators.
Harshul Singhal and Chris Balbach teaches OpenStudio to the engineers on regular basis under this contract. From May 2018, Harshul Singhal started teaching OpenStudio through The Energy Simulation Academy (TESA) which is another private organization selected by NREL to conduct such training.

Features
OpenStudio includes a Sketchup Plug-in and other associated applications:
The Sketchup Plug-in allows users to create 3D geometry needed for EnergyPlus using the existing drawing tools.
RunManager manages simulations and workflows and gives users access to the output files through a graphical interface.
ResultsViewer enables browsing, plotting, and comparing EnergyPlus output data, especially time series.

Sketchup Plugin
The OpenStudio Sketchup Plug-in allows users to use the standard SketchUp tools to create and edit EnergyPlus zones and surfaces. It allows SketchUp to view EnergyPlus input files in 3D. The plug-in allows users to mix EnergyPlus simulation content with decorative content.

The plug-in adds the building energy simulation capabilities of EnergyPlus to the SketchUp environment. Users can launch an EnergyPlus simulation of the model and view the results without leaving SketchUp.

The Plug-in allows engineers to:

Create and edit EnergyPlus zones and surfaces
Launch EnergyPlus and view the results without leaving SketchUp
Match interzone surface boundary conditions
Search for surfaces and subsurfaces by object name
Add internal gains and simple outdoor air for load calculations
Add the ideal HVAC system for load calculations
Set and change default constructions
Add daylighting controls and illuminance map

See also
Building information modeling
SketchUp
Trimble Navigation

References

 OpenStudio Online Training, The Energy Simulation Academy

External links
OpenStudio Suite, U.S. DOE
OpenStudio Plug-in, U.S. DOE
Project homepage
GitHub project
OpenStudio Online Training

2008 software
Building information modeling
Cross-platform free software
Free computer-aided design software